= Poland national volleyball team =

Poland men's national volleyball team may refer to:

- Poland men's national volleyball team
- Poland women's national volleyball team
